George Edward Brigstocke was an Anglican priest.

Brigstocke was educated at Marlborough and Keble College, Oxford and ordained in 1915. After curacies in Castleford and Stockton-on-Tees he held incumbencies at Horden and Hull. He was Provost of St Newcastle Cathedral from  1938 to 1947 then Principal of the College of the Venerable Bede, Durham until 1959. The College was for the training of school teachers and during World War II Brigstocke had served as a teacher of scripture for those pupils of Dame Allan's Schools who had not been evacuated, and at which schools he also chaired the governing body.  He was a Canon Residentiary at Durham Cathedral and then Examining Chaplain to the Archbishop of Canterbury until he was received into the Roman Catholic Church in 1965. He died on 25 October 1971.

One son, Hugh, was a noted art historian, while the other, John Brigstocke, became an admiral in the Royal Navy.

References

Year of birth unknown
People educated at Marlborough College
Alumni of Keble College, Oxford
Provosts and Deans of Newcastle
Anglican priest converts to Roman Catholicism
20th-century English Anglican priests
1971 deaths